The Sultan Qaboos Cup, also known as the HM's Cup, is Oman's premier knockout tournament for men's football. It was officially created in 1972 and the champions of that edition were Al-Ahli. Shortly known as Oman cup. Currently the most successful club in the league is Dhofar with a total of ten titles to their name, with the latest win at the 2020-2021 season.

Sponsorship
On 4 March 2015, Oman's leading financial services provider, BankMuscat agreed to come on board as the Presenting Partner for the 2014–15 Sultan Qaboos Cup.

Championship history

Al-Seeb clinched their fourth title of the HM's Cup and are the current reigning champions.

Year by year

Cities
The following table lists the Oman Professional League champions by cities.

Performance by club

*Includes championships won by Ruwi.

See also

 Oman Professional League
 Oman Professional League Cup
 Oman Super Cup

References

External links
Sultan Cup on soccerway.com
Sultan Cup – Hailoosport.com (Arabic)
Sultan Cup – Hailoosport.com

 
1
1972 establishments in Oman